Malaysia won its first Olympic medal in the men's doubles competitions in badminton.  30 pairs from 21 nations competed in men's doubles.

Results

Top Half

Bottom Half

Finals

References

External links
 http://www.tournamentsoftware.com/sport/tournament.aspx?id=7DAA3E19-5D58-42B1-9681-290317AB4934

Badminton at the 1992 Summer Olympics
Men's events at the 1992 Summer Olympics